Mount Brooke is a large isolated mountain in Antarctica,  high, standing  northwest of Mount Gran and dominating the area near the heads of Mackay Glacier and Mawson Glacier. It was named for Lieutenant Commander F.R. Brooke, Royal Navy, leader of the 1957 New Zealand Northern Survey Party of the Commonwealth Trans-Antarctic Expedition, 1956–58.

There is another Mount Brooke in the Yukon. It was named in 1918 in honour of Billy Brooke, a Canadian grand-nephew of Rajah Charles Brooke via his son Esca, who had died as a prisoner of war in Germany 1917.

References 

Mountains of Oates Land